Jumbee and Other Uncanny Tales is a collection of fantasy and horror short stories by American writer Henry S. Whitehead. It was released in 1944 and was his first book published by Arkham House.  1,559 copies were printed. The introduction is by Whitehead's fellow Floridian Robert H. Barlow.

The stories for this volume were taken chiefly from the magazines Weird Tales and Adventure.

Contents

Jumbee and Other Uncanny Tales contains the following tales:

 "Henry S. Whitehead", by R.H. Barlow
 "Jumbee"
 "Cassius"
 "Black Tancrède"
 "The Shadows"
 "Sweet Grass"
 "The Black Beast"
 "Seven Turns in a Hangman's Rope"
 "The Tree-Man"
 "Passing of a God"
 "Mrs. Lorriquer"
 "Hill Drums"
 "The Projection of Armand Dubois"
 "The Lips"
 "The Fireplace"

Reception

Eudora Welty, reviewing Jumbee for the New York Times, praised the collection as "gentle, matter-of-fact, rather fatherly stories which produce some of the most point-blank ghosts that have jumped at us anywhere" and concluded that "these little stories have charm -- perhaps it is the gentleness of the author's personality pervading their horrifying content that makes them piquant". E. F. Bleiler wrote that "Although the subject matter is often sensational, the treatment is restrained, smooth, and sophisticated,
with much local color and with an attempt at social realism. . . . Whitehead is at his best when he discusses the folkways of the old aristocracy and middle class".

See also
 Jumbee, supernatural belief in the Caribbean

References

Sources

1944 short story collections
Fantasy short story collections
Horror short story collections
Arkham House books